Hawa Yakubu Ogede (24 March 1948 – 20 March 2007) was a Ghanaian politician. She was a Member of Parliament in the Fourth Republic of Ghana and also served as Minister for Tourism.

Early life and  education 
Hawa Yakubu was born at Tarkwa in the Western Region of Ghana. She  is a native of Pusiga in the Upper East Region. Hawa Yakubu being a member of the Bissa ethnic group, was a founding member of the annual Zekula  festival.

Yakubu had her early education at Zebilla Middle School and her secondary education at the Navrongo Secondary School. She had her tertiary education at the Accra Polytechnic (now the Accra Technical University) where she obtained her diploma in Institutional Management.

Career
Prior to entering politics, Yakubu was a domestic bursar and a businesswoman. She worked as the bursar.

Political career
In 1979, Yakubu was elected unopposed to her local council and was the youngest member of the constituent assembly which wrote the constitution of the Ghana's Third Republic. She also served as the Women's Leader for the United National Convention when the party was founded  in 1979. Yakubu fled to London and later Nigeria when a military coup occurred in 1981. She lived in voluntary exile until 1991.

In that year, Yakubu returned to Ghana and, in the following year, contested a seat in parliament from the Bawku Central district, which she won despite being an independent candidate. She was elected into the first parliament of the fourth republic of Ghana on 7 January 1993 after she was pronounced winner at the 1992 Ghanaian parliamentary election held on 29 December 1992. She then lost the seat under controversial circumstances and moved to Cotonou, Benin until 2000.

In 2000, she returned to Ghana and won back her seat. In 2001 and 2002, she was appointed to be Minister of Tourism under President John Kufuor. She also served at this time as a Ghanaian representative to the Economic Community of West African States (ECOWAS) parliament. Yakubu lost her parliament seat in 2004.

At the time of her death in 2007, it was reported that she had been suffering from cancer for quite some time and had sought treatment in London and South Africa.

Death 
She died in London, England, due to cancer. She is survived by three children, Derek Ayebo from her first marriage and Amanda and Didi Ogede from her second marriage.

References

 ""Iron lady" is no more", 20 March 2007, Ghanaweb.com

External links
 Hawafoundation.org
 "Ghana: Funeral Programme of Madam Hawa Yakubu" 11 April 2007, Ghanaian Chronicle

1948 births
2007 deaths
Ghanaian Muslims
People from Western Region (Ghana)
New Patriotic Party politicians
Tourism ministers of Ghana
Ghanaian MPs 1993–1997
Ghanaian MPs 2001–2005
Deaths from cancer in England
Accra Technical University alumni